Joseph H. Bellis (April 26, 1867 – March 1, 1920) was a politician from Maryland. He served as a member of the Maryland Senate in 1912 and served as sheriff of Anne Arundel County from 1918 to 1919.

Early life
Joseph H. Bellis was born on April 26, 1867, in Annapolis, Maryland, to Ellen (née Tolson) and William Henry Bellis. He attended private and public schools in Annapolis. He attended St. John's College for three years.

Career
Bellis owned William H. Bellis & Co., a naval outfitter business. He then served as president of the company.

Bellis was a Democrat. He served in the Maryland Senate, representing Anne Arundel County, in 1912. He resigned in anticipation of being elected postmaster of Annapolis, but did get the position. He served as sheriff of Anne Arundel County from 1918 to 1919. Bellis served one term on the Annapolis City Council. He also served as president of the Board of Supervisors of Annapolis. Bellis also as chief marshal of the volunteer fire department of Annapolis. He served three years as president of the Board of Election Supervisors in Anne Arundel County.

Bellis served as a member of the board of governors and visitors of St. John's College.

Personal life
Bellis did not marry. Bellis died on March 1, 1920, at his home in Annapolis. He was buried at St. Anne's Cemetery in Annapolis.

References

External links

1867 births
1920 deaths
Politicians from Annapolis, Maryland
Democratic Party Maryland state senators
Maryland sheriffs
Annapolis City Council members
20th-century American politicians